Medford is an ancient Saxony surname, found in Northumberland (North East England) and may refer to

 Don Medford, television director.
 Hernan Medford, professional soccer player.
 Kay Medford, actress.
 Paul J. Medford, actor.

See also 

 Medford (disambiguation)

Surnames

English-language surnames
Surnames of English origin
Surnames of British Isles origin
Surnames of Old English origin
English toponymic surnames